The Women's Individual Sprint event at the 2010 South American Games was held on 18 March.  The qualifications and quarterfinals were held on the morning and the semifinals and finals on the evening.

Medalists

Results

Qualification

Quarterfinals

Semifinals

Finals

References
Qualification
Quarterfinals

Track cycling at the 2010 South American Games
Women's sprint (track cycling)